This is list of archives in Pakistan.

Public 
 National Archives of Pakistan, Islamabad
 Punjab Archives, Lahore
 Sindh Archives, Karachi

Private 
 Mountain Heritage Archives, Gilgit-Baltistan
 Citizen's Archive of Pakistan, Karachi

See also 

 List of archives
 List of museums in Pakistan
 Culture of Pakistan

External links 

 
Archives
Pakistan
Archives